P'aqu Urqu (Quechua p'aqu blond, fair, a color similar to gold, urqu mountain, "'blond' or slightly golden mountain", Hispanicized spelling Pacoorcco) is a mountain in the Andes of Peru, about  high. It is located in the Arequipa Region, Castilla Province, in the south of the Andagua District. P'aqu Urqu lies north-west of Yanawara and north of Huch'uy Yanawara ("little Yanawara", Hispanicized Uchuy Yanahuara).

See also 
 Qullpa
 Yanqha

References

Mountains of Peru
Mountains of Arequipa Region